The 1982 Sugar Bowl was the 48th edition of the college football bowl game, played at the Louisiana Superdome in New Orleans, Louisiana, on Friday, January 1. Part of the 1981–82 bowl game season, it matched the #2 Georgia Bulldogs of the Southeastern Conference (SEC), the defending national champions, and the #8 Pittsburgh Panthers, an independent. The slight underdog Panthers won the game

Teams

Georgia

Pittsburgh

Game summary
The game kicked off shortly after 7 p.m. CST, televised by ABC, at the same time as the Orange Bowl on NBC.

Junior quarterback Dan Marino, a future first round draft pick, started for Pittsburgh and Buck Belue for Georgia. The Bulldogs relied on their running game, powered by sophomore Herschel Walker, who rushed for two touchdowns. Scoreless in the first quarter, Georgia led early with an 8-yard run from Walker, then Pitt kicked a field goal and the score was 7–3 at halftime.

Scoring increased in the second half, with five lead changes. The Panthers scored a touchdown to go ahead 10–7; Georgia got the lead back and the game was 13–10 (as a result of a missed PAT) at the end of the third quarter. Marino threw a short touchdown to John Brown to take back the lead at  Georgia scored again with a 6-yard pass and the game was  Pitt reclaimed the lead with just 35 seconds to go with a 33-yard pass from Marino to Brown on 4th and 4 and won

Scoring
First quarter
No scoring
Second quarter
Georgia – Herschel Walker 8-yard run (Kevin Butler kick)
Pitt –  Snuffy Everett 41-yard field goal
Third quarter
Pitt – Julius Dawkins 30-yard pass from Dan Marino (Everett kick)
Georgia – Walker 10-yard run (kick failed)
Fourth quarter
Pitt – John Brown 6-yard pass from Marino (Everett kick)
Georgia – Clarence Kay 6-yard pass from Buck Belue (Butler kick)
Pitt – Brown 33-yard pass from Marino (Everett kick)

Statistics
{| class=wikitable style="text-align:center"
! Statistics !! Pittsburgh !!   Georgia  
|-
|First downs ||27||11
|-
|Rushing yards||44–208||36–141
|-
|Passing yards||261||83
|-
|Passing ||26–41–2 ||8–15–2
|-
|Total offense ||85–469||51–224
|-
|Punts–average ||2–44.5||6–39.5
|-
|Fumbles–lost ||5–3||2–2
|-
|Turnovers||5||4
|-
|Penalties–yards ||14–96||5–35
|}

Aftermath
Pittsburgh moved up to fourth  in the final polls, while the Bulldogs dropped to sixth  It has often been called one of the greatest bowl games, and bowl upsets, of all time. It also marks the last time the Pitt Panthers won a major bowl game.

Legacy
Twenty-two Pittsburgh Panthers were drafted over the next four years by the National Football League. Six of them were selected in the first round, including Marino, Jim Covert, Tim Lewis, Bill Maas, Chris Doleman, and Bill Fralic. Marino and Doleman were elected to the Pro Football Hall of Fame. Covert is the only player on the winning team to win a Super Bowl, four years later in Super Bowl XX with the Chicago Bears, also played in the Superdome.
Tom Flynn, Free Safety for Pitt also won a Super Bowl XXI with the New York Giants when they beat Denver

References

Sugar Bowl
Sugar Bowl
Georgia Bulldogs football bowl games
Pittsburgh Panthers football bowl games
Sugar Bowl
Sugar Bowl